Song of the Black Mountains (German: Das Lied der Schwarzen Berge) or Phantom of Durmitor is a 1933 German-Yugoslav film directed by K. Breiness and Hans Natge and starring Ita Rina, Blandine Ebinger and Ernst Dumcke. It was shot at the Terra Studios in Berlin.

Cast
 Ita Rina as Jela Gruic  
 Blandine Ebinger as Madame Mériaux  
 Ernst Dumcke as Schenk  
 Albert Kersten as Duschan Gruic  
 Hinko Nucic as Der alte Gruic  
 Heinz Salfner as M. Mériaux  
 Carl de Vogt as Windolf  
 Karl Platen 
 Otto Kronburger
 Paul Günther
 Arndt von Rautenfeld
 Busch

References

Bibliography 
 Daniel Biltereyst & Daniela Treveri Gennari. Moralizing Cinema: Film, Catholicism, and Power. Routledge, 2014.
 Klaus, Ulrich J. Deutsche Tonfilme: Jahrgang 1933. Klaus-Archiv, 1988.

External links 
 

1933 films
Films of the Weimar Republic
1930s German-language films
German black-and-white films
1930s German films
Films shot at Terra Studios